Schizocosa crassipalpata is a species of wolf spider in the family Lycosidae. It is found in the United States and Canada.

References

Lycosidae
Articles created by Qbugbot
Spiders described in 1951
Spiders of the United States
Spiders of Canada